Olpe – Märkischer Kreis I is an electoral constituency (German: Wahlkreis) represented in the Bundestag. It elects one member via first-past-the-post voting. Under the current constituency numbering system, it is designated as constituency 149. It is located in southern North Rhine-Westphalia, comprising the Olpe district and the southern part of the Märkischer Kreis district.

Olpe – Märkischer Kreis I was created for the 1980 federal election. Since 2021, it has been represented by Florian Müller of the Christian Democratic Union (CDU).

Geography
Olpe – Märkischer Kreis I is located in southern North Rhine-Westphalia. As of the 2021 federal election, it comprises the entirety of the Olpe district and the municipalities of Halver, Herscheid, Kierspe, Lüdenscheid, Meinerzhagen, and Schalksmühle from the Märkischer Kreis district.

History
Olpe – Märkischer Kreis I was created in 1980, then known as Olpe – Siegen-Wittgenstein II. It acquired its current name in the 2002 election. In the 1980 through 1998 elections, it was constituency 121 in the numbering system. From 2002 through 2009, it was number 150. Since 2013, it has been number 149.

Originally, the constituency comprised the Olpe district and the municipalities of Freudenberg, Hilchenbach, and Kreuztal from the Siegen-Wittgenstein district. It acquired its current borders in the 2002 election.

Members
The constituency has been held by the Christian Democratic Union (CDU) since its creation. It was first represented by Willi Weiskirch from 1980 to 1987, followed by Joachim Grünewald from 1987 to 1994. Hartmut Schauerte became representative in 1994 and served until 2009. Matthias Heider was elected in 2009, and re-elected in 2013 and 2017. He was succeeded by Florian Müller in 2021.

Election results

2021 election

2017 election

2013 election

2009 election

Notes

References

Federal electoral districts in North Rhine-Westphalia
1980 establishments in West Germany
Constituencies established in 1980
Olpe (district)
Märkischer Kreis